The following railroads operate in the U.S. state of Kentucky.

Common freight carriers
BNSF Railway (BNSF)
Canadian National Railway (CN) through subsidiary Illinois Central Railroad (IC)
CSX Transportation (CSXT) including subsidiary Carrollton Railroad (CARR)
Operates the Glasgow Railway
Fredonia Valley Railroad (FVRR)
Kentucky and Tennessee Railway (KT)
KWT Railway (KWT)
Louisville and Indiana Railroad (LIRC)
Louisville Riverport Railroad (LORJ)
Norfolk Southern Railway (NS) including subsidiary Cincinnati, New Orleans and Texas Pacific Railway (CNTP)
Paducah and Illinois Railroad (PI)
Paducah and Louisville Railway (PAL)
R.J. Corman Railroad/Bardstown Line (RJCR)
R.J. Corman Railroad/Central Kentucky Lines (RJCC)
R.J. Corman Railroad/Memphis Line (RJCM)
Tennken Railroad (TKEN)
Transkentucky Transportation Railroad (TTIS)
West Tennessee Railroad (WTNN)

Private freight carriers
Cando Contracting
Centrus Energy
JRL Coal
Respondek Railroad
R.J. Corman Railroad Switching

Passenger carriers

Amtrak (AMTK) - Amtrak has stations at Ashland, South Portsmouth - South Shore, Maysville, and Fulton. There is also an  Amtrak bus route connecting Louisville to Indianapolis.

Defunct railroads

Electric
Blue Grass Traction Company
Camden Interstate Railway
Central Kentucky Traction Company
Georgetown and Lexington Traction Company
Louisville Railway
Louisville, Anchorage and Pewee Valley Electric Railway
Louisville and Eastern Railroad
Louisville and Interurban Railroad
Louisville and Northern Railway and Lighting Company
Ohio Valley Electric Railway

See also
List of United States railroads

Notes

References

Association of American Railroads (2003), Railroad Service in Kentucky (PDF). Retrieved May 9, 2005.

Further reading
 

Kentucky
 
 
Railroads